Mr. Oscar Brown Jr. Goes to Washington is a 1965 live album by vocalist Oscar Brown Jr., recorded at The Cellar Door in Washington D.C.

Track listing 
All tracks composed by Oscar Brown; except where noted.
 "One Life" – 3:14
 "Beautiful Girl" – 3:15
 "Maxine" – 2:50
 "Maggie" – 3:01
 "Living Double in a World of Trouble" – 3:29
 "Glorious Tired Feeling" – 2:43
 "Tower of Time" – 3:27
 "Muffled Drums" – 3:43
 "Brother, Where Are You" – 4:09
 "Forty Acres and a Mule" – 3:33
 "Call of the City" – 2:53
 "Summer in the City" (Curtis Norman, Oscar Brown Jr.) – 3:27
 "Brother, Where Are You" – 5:38

Personnel 
 Oscar Brown Jr. – vocals
 Floyd Morris – piano, arrangements
 Phil Upchurch – guitar
 Herbert Brown – double bass
 Curtis Boyd – drums

References 

1965 live albums
Oscar Brown albums
Fontana Records live albums
Live vocal jazz albums